Muhammad Azhar bin Mohd Apandi (born 16 May 1999) is a Malaysian professional footballer who plays as a defender for Malaysia Super League club Kuala Lumpur City.

Club career

Perak
On 21 August 2021, it was announced that Azhar eligible to play with the club.

On 22 August 2021, Azhar made his debut for Perak II in a 0–3 loss against PDRM FC.

On 28 August 2021, Azhar made his league debut for Perak coming off the bench in a 1-0 loss to Kedah Darul Aman.

Career statistics

Club

References

1999 births
Living people
People from Pahang
Malaysian footballers
Association football defenders
Kuala Lumpur City F.C. players
Perak F.C. players
Malaysia Super League players
Malaysia youth international footballers